Charles Abner Phelps (October 19, 1820 – April 27, 1902) was a U.S. physician, diplomat, and politician, who  served as a member, and the Speaker, of the Massachusetts House of Representatives, and as a member and the President of the Massachusetts Senate.

Early life and education
Phelps was born to Dr. Abner Phelps and Delia Hubbell (Clark) Phelps on October 19, 1820 on Congress Street in Boston, Massachusetts.  Phelps attended the Mount Pleasant Classical School in Amherst, Massachusetts, where one of his classmates was Henry Ward Beecher  Phelps then went on to study at the Boston Latin School and then Phillips Academy in Andover, Massachusetts, he then studied with a private tutor in Cambridge, Massachusetts to prepare himself for Yale College.  Phelps attended Yale for a year then he transferred to Union College where he graduated in 1841.  Phelps then attended Harvard Medical School graduating in 1844, he did his post graduate work at the Jefferson Medical College in Philadelphia, Pennsylvania.

Family life
Phelps married Phoebe Harris of Albany, New York, she was the sister of U.S. Senator Ira Harris.  On September 14, 1845 their son Charles Harris Phelps was born. Charles physically abused his wife and had her committed to an insane asylum following a confrontation about his extramarital affairs. Charles also attempted to deprive his wife of access to their children. Phoebe took her daughter and fled to a Quaker family but Charles tracked them down and brought them back, so Phoebe sought help from Susan B. Anthony. Anthony spirited the mother and daughter out of town, working to find a safe and confidential place for them. Anthony faced backlash from prominent reformers including Wendell Phillips and William Lloyd Garrison. Massachusetts law gave entire guardianship over children to fathers, and Phillips and Garrison argued that Anthony should obey the law and stay out of the domestic dispute. Anthony refused to reveal Phoebe and her daughter's location. However, Charles was relentless and his agents eventually recaptured the daughter. Phoebe never saw her daughter again.

See also
 77th Massachusetts General Court (1856)
 78th Massachusetts General Court (1857)
 80th Massachusetts General Court (1859)

References

Speakers of the Massachusetts House of Representatives
Massachusetts Know Nothings
Republican Party members of the Massachusetts House of Representatives
Harvard Medical School alumni
Union College (New York) alumni
Phillips Academy alumni
Republican Party Massachusetts state senators
Presidents of the Massachusetts Senate
People from Boston
19th-century American people
19th-century American diplomats
American consuls
1820 births
1902 deaths